Eupithecia regina is a moth in the family Geometridae first described by Taylor in 1906. It has been recorded in North America from Manitoba, Saskatchewan, Alberta, British Columbia, Georgia and North Carolina.

The forewings and hindwings are grey. There is a broad, darker, median band on the forewings, bordered outwardly by a narrower pale area.

References

Moths described in 1906
regina
Moths of North America